Kutulik (Khutuleg) is a rural locality (a settlement) and the administrative center of Alarsky District of Ust-Orda Buryat Okrug, Irkutsk Oblast, Russia. Population:

References

Notes

Sources

Registry of the Administrative-Territorial Formations of Irkutsk Oblast 

Rural localities in Irkutsk Oblast